Mark Meer is a Canadian actor, writer and improvisor, based in Edmonton, Alberta. He is known for his role in the Mass Effect trilogy, in which he stars as the voice of the player character, Commander Shepard. His voice is featured in a number of other games from BioWare Corp., notably the Baldur's Gate and Dragon Age series. Meer stars as the voice of the player character William Mackenzie in The Long Dark from Hinterland Studio. He also works in animation, providing the voice for several characters in a series of cartoon shorts produced by Rantdog Animation Studios, and the voice of Horse in the Captain Canuck web series starring Kris Holden-Ried and Tatiana Maslany.

Career 
Meer starred as the male voice of the main player character, Commander Shepard, in the Mass Effect trilogy. His voice is featured in a number of other games from BioWare Corp., notably the Baldur's Gate and Dragon Age series. Meer starred as the voice of the player character William Mackenzie in The Long Dark from Hinterland Studio, which also features his Mass Effect counterpart, Jennifer Hale.

Meer is a core company member of the Canadian Comedy Award-winning live improvised soap opera Die-Nasty, and was the first performer to complete the annual 53-hour long Die-Nasty Soap-A-Thon without sleep.
He is a longtime member of Rapid Fire Theatre, a founder of the sketch comedy/improv troupe Gordon's Big Bald Head, and performs regularly at Edmonton's Varscona Theatre. He is a performer and writer on CBC Radio's sketch comedy program The Irrelevant Show and APTN's Caution: May Contain Nuts, and is a co-creator, writer and star of Super Channel's Tiny Plastic Men.

In 2005, Meer was nominated for an Elizabeth Sterling Haynes Award for co-writing the surreal sketch comedy show, Lobster Telephone (in which he also played Salvador Dalí), with the ladies of Panties Productions. In 2006, he was honored with the Sterling Award for Outstanding Performance By An Actor In A Supporting Role for playing multiple roles in Helen's Necklace, produced by Shadow Theatre. In 2011, he was nominated for five Canadian Comedy Awards, including Best Male Improvisor, for which he was also nominated in 2012, 2013, 2014, and 2015. In December 2012, Mark Meer was voted Edmontonian of the Year in an online poll held by Gig City, an Edmonton arts and entertainment website. Tiny Plastic Men, which Meer co-created and writes for Canada's Super Channel, has been nominated at the Canadian Screen Awards for Best Comedy Series in 2014, 2015, and 2016, and Meer himself was nominated for the CSA for Best Performance by an Actor in a Continuing Leading Comedic Role in 2015 for his work on the show.

In 2016, Meer won the AMPIA Award for Best Performance by an Actor for the Tiny Plastic Men episode "Crisis on Infinite Octobers".

Meer appeared at Dragon*Con 2012 cosplaying as Commander Shepard, his most famous character. Though his attendance was not publicly advertised, some fans immediately recognized him.

In 2021, Meer became a player in The Black Dice Society, a Ravenloft themed Dungeons & Dragons actual play show on the official Wizards of the Coast channels.

Personal life
Meer is married to Belinda Cornish, an actress who has done work in BioWare games as well, most notably voicing Rana Thanoptis in the Mass Effect series, and Goldanna and The Baroness in the Dragon Age series. Cornish also co-stars with Meer in Tiny Plastic Men, and been nominated for a Canadian Screen Award for her work on the show.

Filmography

Video games
All roles listed are voice roles and for the English versions where applicable.

Web shows and series

References

External links

Living people
Canadian male comedians
Canadian male film actors
Canadian male television actors
Canadian male video game actors
Canadian male voice actors
Male actors from Edmonton
20th-century Canadian male actors
20th-century Canadian comedians
21st-century Canadian male actors
21st-century Canadian comedians
Comedians from Alberta
1971 births